Mixed Hockeyclub Oranje Zwart was a Dutch field hockey club located in Eindhoven, North Brabant, which was founded on 1 September 1933. With around 1,700 members – as of 3 May 2006 – it is one of the biggest clubs in the Netherlands. The 2,000 capacity Sportpark Aalsterweg is their home venue.

In 2016, the club merged with neighbouring club EMHC. The name of the new club is HC Oranje-Rood.

Honours

Men
Hoofdklasse: 4
 2004–05, 2013–14, 2014–15, 2015–16
Euro Hockey League: 1
 2014-15
EuroHockey Cup Winners Cup: 2
 2002, 2004
Dutch national title indoor hockey: 10
 1981, 1985, 1991, 1992, 1994, 1997, 2002, 2003, 2004, 2005

Women
National title: 3
 1955–56, 1968–69, 1969–70

Notable players from Oranje Zwart

References

External links
 Official website Oranje Zwart

 
Sports clubs in Eindhoven
Dutch field hockey clubs
Field hockey clubs established in 1933
1933 establishments in the Netherlands
Field hockey  clubs disestablished in 2016
2016 disestablishments in the Netherlands